Can Dizdar is a Turkish diplomat.

Education
Dizdar received his B.A. in Political Science from Ankara University, Turkey, in 1989, and his M.A. at the College of Europe in Bruges, Belgium, in 1994. He also attended the Royal College of Defense Studies, in London, in 2004.

Career
After joining the Turkish Ministry of Foreign Affairs, Dizdar served abroad at the Turkish Embassies in Helsinki (1995-1997), Abu Dhabi (1997-1999), London (2001-2005), and at the Turkish Permanent Mission to the UN in New York (2007-2010). Subsequently, Dizdar worked at the UN Department of Political Affairs in New York City, as a Senior Political Officer (2010-2011).

At the Turkish Ministry of Foreign Affairs Headquarters in Ankara, Dizdar worked at the EU and Cyprus Departments, served as the Head of Department at the Policy Planning Division (2005-2007), Deputy Director General for the Middle East (2011-2014) and Director General for the Middle East (2014-2016).

Between 2016-2021, Dizdar served as the Turkish Ambassador to the United Arab Emirates.

Personal life
Can Dizdar is married to Demet Dizdar with a son.

References

21st-century Turkish diplomats
Ambassadors of Turkey to the United Arab Emirates
Year of birth missing (living people)
Living people